Laurie Hill may refer to:

 Laurie Hill (footballer, born 1942) (1942–2014), Australian rules footballer
 Laurie Hill (footballer, born 1970), American-born Mexican international soccer player
 the title character of Laurie Hill (TV series), an American television series

See also
 Lauren Hill (disambiguation)